The 2014 season for  began in January at the 2014 Tour Down Under. As a UCI ProTeam, they were automatically invited and obligated to send a squad to every event in the 2014 UCI World Tour.

Team roster

Riders who joined the team for the 2014 season

Riders who left the team during or after the 2013 season

Season victories

References

2014 road cycling season by team
Groupama–FDJ
2014 in French sport